Dennis Caryl (born August 31, 1942) is a former American football coach.  He served as the head football coach at Upper Iowa University from 1977 to 1979 and Washburn University from 1990 to 1993, compiling a career college football coaching record of 16–52.  After resigning from Washburn eight games into the 1993 season, Caryl was the defensive coordinator at Western New Mexico University in 1994.  The following year, he was hired as defensive coordinator at Sonoma State University.

Head coaching record

College football

Notes

References

1942 births
Living people
Lincoln Blue Tigers football coaches
Northwestern Red Raiders football coaches
Oklahoma Panhandle State Aggies football coaches
Sonoma State Cossacks football coaches
Tennessee Tech Golden Eagles football coaches
Upper Iowa Peacocks football coaches
Washburn Ichabods football coaches
Western New Mexico Mustangs football coaches
College track and field coaches in the United States
College women's basketball coaches in the United States
College wrestling coaches in the United States
High school basketball coaches in Missouri
High school football coaches in Missouri
Northwest Missouri State University alumni